Tiansheng Subdistrict is a subdistrict in Beibei District, Chongqing, China. , it administers the following nine residential neighborhoods:
Xinxing Road Community
Southwest University North Community
Tianshengqiao Community
Southwest University South Community
Beixia Road Community
Longxi Road Community
Hehuachi Community
Benyue Road Community
Quanwaiyuan Community

See also 
 List of township-level divisions of Chongqing

References 

Township-level divisions of Chongqing